This is a list of town tramway systems in Ukraine by oblast.  It includes all tram systems, past and present; cities with currently operating systems are indicated in bold. The use of the diamond (♦) symbol indicates where there were (or are) two or more independent tram systems operating concurrently within a single metropolitan area.  Those tram systems that operated on other than standard gauge track (where known) are indicated in the 'Notes' column.

Chernihiv Oblast

Chernivtsi Oblast

Autonomous Republic of Crimea

Dnipropetrovsk Oblast

Donetsk Oblast

Kharkiv Oblast

Kirovohrad Oblast

Kyiv Municipality

Luhansk Oblast

Lviv Oblast

Mykolaiv Oblast

Odesa Oblast

Poltava Oblast

Sevastopol

Sumy Oblast

Vinnytsia Oblast

Zaporizhzhia Oblast

Zhytomyr Oblast

See also
List of trolleybus systems in Ukraine
List of town tramway systems in Europe
List of tram and light rail transit systems
List of metro systems

References
Books, Periodicals and External Links

Tramways
Ukraine